Zoran Varvodić (born 26 December 1963) is a Croatian former professional footballer who played as a goalkeeper.

Early and personal life
Born in Split, Varvodić's son Miro is also a professional footballer. During the 1980s, he was nicknamed "Rambo" because of the similar hairstyle he wore at the time.

Career
Varvodić played throughout Yugoslavia for GOŠK Dubrovnik, Hajduk Split, Spartak Subotica and Olimpija Ljubljana, then after Yugoslav break-up with Croatian clubs Dubrovnik, Primorac Stobreč, NK Zadar, RNK Split, and in Slovenia with Korotan. He also played in Spain for Cádiz.

1987 Yugoslav Cup final
He is famous amongst Hajduk Split fans thanks to his epic performance in the 1986–87 Yugoslav Cup final against NK Rijeka. He entered the game in the 119th minute so that he can join the penalty shootout where he managed to save 3 penalties and score the winning one.

References

External links
 

1963 births
Living people
Footballers from Split, Croatia
Association football goalkeepers
Yugoslav footballers
Croatian footballers
NK GOŠK Dubrovnik players
HNK Hajduk Split players
FK Spartak Subotica players
NK Olimpija Ljubljana (1945–2005) players
Cádiz CF players
NK Primorac 1929 players
NK Zadar players
NK Korotan Prevalje players
RNK Split players
Yugoslav First League players
La Liga players
Croatian Football League players
Slovenian PrvaLiga players
Croatian expatriate footballers
Expatriate footballers in Spain
Croatian expatriate sportspeople in Spain
Expatriate footballers in Slovenia
Croatian expatriate sportspeople in Slovenia
HNK Hajduk Split non-playing staff